This is a list of television and radio stations along with a list of media outlets in and around Iași, Romania including the Iași County.

TV stations

The cable providers in Iași are Telekom Romania, Orange Romania, UPC Romania and Digi Romania.

Radio

Iași stations

Other stations
Numerous radio stations outside Iași are also licensed to broadcast in the Iași area (Iași, Pașcani, Hârlău).

Former stations

Print

Newspapers

Regional dailies 
 Evenimentul
 Monitorul
 Ziarul de Iași
 Sport Moldova
 Gazeta de Moldova

Local dailies
 24 Ore
 Bună Ziua Iași
 Flacăra Iașului
 Jurnalul de Est
 Ziua de Iași

Free dailies
 Adevărul de seară
 Iași Plus

Alternative
 Cronica de Iași
 Curierul de Iași
 Ieșeanul
 Financiarul
 Metropolis
 Orizontul - Pașcani
 Ziarul Lumina

Student
 Opinia Studențească
 Gazeta de Moldova

Former newspapers
 Adevărul
 Constituționalul
 Cuvântul de Iași
 Contemporanul
 Der Wecker
 România literară
 Viața Românească
 Zimbrul și Vulturul

Magazines
 Convorbiri Literare
 Cronica
 Dacia literară
 Timpul

Book publishers
 Cermi
 Junimea
 Polirom
 Princeps Edit
 Timpul
 Adi Center

Other
 Iași Invest

References

External links
Adi Center | Editura StudIS | Print Company Iași
Radio and TV stations in Iași
FMscan
Radio Stations in Iași at radiostationworld.com
Romanian Publishing Association